Lake Pyaozero is a large freshwater lake in the Republic of Karelia, northwestern part of Russia. It has an area of 659 km², and it is drained by the river Kovda. There are many islands on the lake with total area of 186 km². Among the rivers that flow into lake Pyaozero is the river Oulankajoki that begins in Finland, where one of its tributaries is the river Kitkanjoki that begins from lake Kitkajärvi in Finland. From south also the waters of Lake Topozero in the Republic of Karelia flow into the Lake Pyaozero.

References

Lakes of the Republic of Karelia
LPyaozero